The Battle of Biberach was fought on 2 October 1796 between a French Republican army led by Jean Victor Marie Moreau and a Habsburg Austrian army led by Maximilian Anton Karl, Count Baillet de Latour. The French army paused in its retreat toward the Rhine River to savage the pursuing Austrians. The action occurred during the War of the First Coalition, part of the French Revolutionary Wars.

During the summer of 1796, the two armies of Jean-Baptiste Jourdan in the north and Moreau in the south advanced into southern Germany. They were opposed by Archduke Charles, Duke of Teschen who oversaw two Austrian armies under Latour and Wilhelm von Wartensleben. At the Battle of Amberg on 24 August 1796, Charles and Wartensleben combined to throw superior strength against Jourdan while Moreau was separated from his colleague. After Jourdan was beaten again at the Battle of Würzburg on 3 September, Moreau was forced to abandon southern Bavaria to avoid being cut off from France. As the outnumbered Latour doggedly followed the French retreat, Moreau lashed out at him at Biberach. For a loss of 500 soldiers killed and wounded, Moreau's troops inflicted 300 killed and wounded on their enemies and captured 4,000 prisoners, 18 artillery pieces, and two colors. After the engagement, Latour followed the French at a more respectful distance. The next action was the Battle of Emmendingen on 19 October.

Battle
The French troops under General Louis Desaix attacked at noon on October 2, advanced via Seekirch, threw back an enemy detachment from Ahlen and pursued the Austrians via Gutharzhofen to Burren. The now open right flank of the imperial division under Siegfried Kospoth forced this general to retreat his troops via Biberach to the Galgenberg, where the French left wing between Birkenhard and Stafflangen developed to attack.

On the other wing, three French columns had meanwhile advanced on the streets of Reichenbach and Schussenried and had begun the attack against the Austrian division Mercandin and Prince de Conde. When the corps under Claude Saint-Cyr with a half-brigade from Sattenbeuren swung across the mossy ground, which was considered impenetrable, against Latour's right flank and the other columns also renewed their attack. Latour had to withdraw his center back to the new position at Groth under the protection of the cavalry. The divisions under Prince Conde and Mercandin were pushed back to Ingoldingen and Winterstätten. After Saint-Cyr's troops marched slowly between Muttensweiler and Wattenweiler, Latour forced him back. Latour, at the necessary time to save his artillery park stood there.

General Desaix had meanwhile decided on the left wing to bypass the opposing lines on the Galgenberg via Oberndorf through the valley there towards Biberach. Latour ordered a general retreat, Field Marshal Lieutenant Mercandin had to retreat to Eberhardzell, Prince Conde to Schweinhausen and Ummendorf, and Kospoth's division through Biberach to the other heights of the Riss. The French advanced from Lindeberg, the garrison of the city and the last four battalions of Kospoth were taken prisoner. Appendorf was set on fire during the retreat. Here, as at Rissegg, the fire was kept up into the night.

The troops of Baillet-Latour were defeated after a short battle and left 300 dead and wounded on the battlefield. In addition, they lost 18 cannons and two regimental flags

Aftermath
Desaix followed on the left wing with two divisions along the Danube; the troops under General Saint-Cyr took the route to Pfullendorf and Stockach. A rearguard remained to watch Latour's defeated troops. The troops under Desaix crossed the Danube near Riedlingen and pursued Sigmaringen. From now on the Austrians contented themselves with following the French from a distance without attempting to stop them again. The fighting flared up again in the Battle of Emmendingen on October 19, when Archduke Charles, Duke of Teschen caught the French again, after the Battle of Schliengen (October 24), Moreau's troops had to retreat across the Rhine.

References
 Smith, Digby. The Napoleonic Wars Data Book. London: Greenhill, 1998. 

Battles involving France
Battles involving Austria
Battles of the French Revolutionary Wars
Battles of the War of the First Coalition
Conflicts in 1796
1796 in the Holy Roman Empire
Battles in Baden-Württemberg
Battles inscribed on the Arc de Triomphe